Orujabad (also Romanized as Orūjābād; also known as Owchābād) is a village in Azadlu Rural District, Muran District, Germi County, Ardabil Province, Iran. At the 2006 census, its population was 47, in 9 families.

References 

Towns and villages in Germi County